Balli railway station (Station code: BLLI) is a smaller railway station in Goa,  under the jurisdiction of Konkan Railway. It lies is in Balli (also referred to as Bali) village off the highway connecting Chandor to Canacona.

Administration
The station falls under the administration of Karwar railway division of Konkan Railway zone, a subsidiary zone of Indian Railways.

Other stations
Madgaon (Margao) railway station in South Goa district is the largest Konkan Railway station within Goa, while Thivim railway station in North Goa comes at second place. The former is a gateway to South Goa, Margao, the urban area of Vasco da Gama and also the beaches of South Goa, while the latter is a gateway to Mapusa town, the emigration-oriented sub-district of Bardez and also the North Goa beach belt.  The Karmali railway station is closest State capital Panjim or Panaji, which is the administrative capital of Goa.

Incidents
On 3 May 2015, 10 bogies of 12223 Mumbai Lokmanya Tilak Terminus– Duronto Express derailed near Balli railway station in South Goa at around 6.30 AM. No casualties.

References

Railway stations in South Goa district
Railway stations along Konkan Railway line
Railway stations opened in 1997
Karwar railway division